Lenin Stadium is a multi-use stadium in Khabarovsk, Russia. It is currently used mostly for association football matches and is the home ground of FC SKA-Khabarovsk. The stadium holds 15,200 people. It is named after communist revolutionary Vladimir Lenin.

References

Sports venues completed in 1951
Football venues in Russia
Bandy venues in Russia
Sports venues built in the Soviet Union
Buildings and structures in Khabarovsk Krai